Blip may refer to:

 Beta-lactamase inhibitor protein
 Blip (website), a defunct web video platform
 Blip.pl, a Polish social networking site
 Blip, a message in the Apache Wave (formerly Google Wave) collaboration platform
 Blip Festival, an annual chiptune music event
 Blip, a radar display indicator of a reflected signal
 Blip (console), a handheld electromechanical game from the 1970s
 Blip Magazine, a literary publication by the founders of Mississippi Review
 The Blip, a fictional event in the Marvel Cinematic Universe

Blips may refer to:
 BLIPS, a type of illegal tax shelter
 Blips (TV series), a children's show in the UK
 Blips, a series of animated shorts accompanying the Radiohead album Kid A
 Blips, a gang in the film Keanu